Cortis & Sonderegger is a collaborative team of two Swiss artists, Jojakim Cortis and Adrian Sonderegger. They are best known for their photographs of their physical recreations of famous photographs.

Life
Cortis was born in 1978 in Aachen, Switzerland. Sonderegger was born in 1980 in Bülach, Switzerland. Since 2001 they have lived and worked in Zurich, Switzerland. Their collaboration began in 2005 while they were students at the Zurich University of the Arts.

Work

The duo are best known for their physical representations of famous photographs, titled Icons and begun in 2012. The recreations involve the use of precision model-making to create three-dimensional miniature dioramas of the scene in the original photograph. Once the diorama is built, the final product is a photograph of the overall scene, often including some of the tools and materials used in its making.

Andreas Gursky's Rhein, the most expensive photograph ever sold, was the first subject of their recreations.

Other subjects of their recreations include:
 the 1937 photography of the Hindenberg disaster by Sam Shere, 
 Charles Levy's 1945 photograph of the Nagasaki nuclear bomb detonation, titled Making of 208-N-43888 by Charles Levy, 19452013,
 the 1934 photograph of the Loch Ness Monster, titled Making of “Nessie” (by Marmaduke Wetherell, 1934)
 the 1989 "Tank Man" photograph of a man obstructing a tank during the Tiananmen square crackdown, and 
 Edwin Aldrin's photograph of man's first step on the moon.

Collections
 Their work Making of Tiananmen (by Stuart Franklin, 1989) is included in the collection of the Museum of Contemporary Photography at Columbia College Chicago.
Making of 'AS11-40-5878' (by Edwin Aldrin, 1969) is included in the collection of the Museum of Fine Arts, Houston.

Awards
 2015/2016 Vevey International Photography Award : Broncolor Prize

References 

People from Aachen
People from Bülach
Zurich University of the Arts alumni
Contemporary sculptors
21st-century Swiss artists
Swiss photographers